Switzerland competed at the 2022 World Athletics Championships in Eugene, United States, from 15 to 24 July 2022. The Swiss Athletics Federation entered 26 athletes.

With 1 bronze medal, Switzerland ended 40th in the medal table, but ranked 25th in the overall placing table with a total of 18 points.

Medalists

Team
On 29 June 2022, the Swiss Athletics Federation announced a 26-member team qualified for the World Athletics Championships, which included the heptathlete Caroline Agnou who was later ruled out due to injury, reducing the Swiss team to 25 athletes. The final entry list published by World Athletics consigned 26 athletes for Switzerland, with Rachel Pellaud being added to the women's 4 × 400 metres relay team. Eventually, Pellaud was not part of the Swiss team that was made up of 25 athletes.

Sprinter Natacha Kouni was included in the team for the women's 4 × 100 metres relay, but finally she had no participation. In the same way, Sarah King was part of the women's 4 × 400 metres relay team, but had no participation.

Results
Switzerland entered 26 athletes, but only 23 of them participated.

Men
Track events

Field events

Women
Track events

* – Indicates the athlete competed in preliminaries but not the final.

Field events

Combined events – Heptathlon

References

External links
Oregon22｜WCH 22｜World Athletics

Nations at the 2022 World Athletics Championships
Switzerland at the World Championships in Athletics
2022 in Swiss sport